María Elena Sánchez González  (born 22 October 1994) is a Spanish water polo goalkeeper who won the silver medal with the women's national water polo team at the 2020 Summer Olympics celebrated in Tokyo, Japan.

International career
In 2018 she won the gold medal at the Mediterranean Games in Tarragona and the bronze at the European Water Polo Championship in Barcelona.

See also
 List of Olympic medalists in water polo
 List of World Aquatics Championships medalists in water polo

References

External links
 
 

Spanish female water polo players
Living people
1994 births
Sportspeople from Terrassa
Water polo players at the 2020 Summer Olympics
Mediterranean Games gold medalists for Spain
Mediterranean Games medalists in water polo
Competitors at the 2018 Mediterranean Games
Medalists at the 2020 Summer Olympics
Olympic silver medalists for Spain in water polo
21st-century Spanish women
Sportswomen from Catalonia
Water polo players from Catalonia